Thirumagan Evera ( – 4 January 2023) was an Indian Tamil politician from the Indian National Congress. He served as a Member of Legislative Assembly of Tamil Nadu, representing Erode East from May 2021 up until his death in January 2023.

Early life and education
Evera was the son of E. V. K. S. Elangovan, who served as a Minister of State under Manmohan Singh (2004–09).

Evera obtained a Bachelor of Arts (B.A) degree in Economics from the University of Madras in 1999.

Death 
On 4 January 2023, Evera suffered chest pains while at his house in Erode. He was taken to a hospital but died on the way. He was 46.

Elections contested

References 

1970s births
Year of birth missing
2023 deaths
Indian politicians
People from Tamil Nadu
Tamil Nadu MLAs 2021–2026
Indian National Congress politicians from Tamil Nadu
People from Erode district